Benamaran (also Romanized as Benamārān; also known as Bīnāmārān) is a village in Sanjabad-e Shomali Rural District, in the Central District of Kowsar County, Ardabil Province, Iran. At the 2006 census, its population was 323, in 67 families.

References 

Tageo

Towns and villages in Kowsar County